Lake Palas Tuzla is a saline lake in Kayseri Province, central Turkey. It is a registered natural protected area.

The lake is situated in the Palas neighborhood of Sarıoğlan district in Kayseri province. The lake is at the center of a closed basin. It is fed by five creeks. During the dry season, the lake basin is covered by a  layer of salt. The lake is the site of a salt works.

The surrounding area of the lake is a wetland, which is located on bird migration routes and habitat of some endemic flora. The wetland was declared a natural protected area of first degree on June 26, 2009.

References

Palas Tuzla
Geography of Kayseri Province
Palas Tuzla
Important Bird Areas of Turkey